The Confession is a 2002 Turkish drama film directed by Zeki Demirkubuz. It was screened in the Un Certain Regard section at the 2002 Cannes Film Festival.

Cast
 Taner Birsel - Harun
 Başak Köklükaya - Nilgün
 Iskender Altin
 Miraç Eronat
 Gülgün Kutlu
 Mirac Eronat

References

External links

TurkishFilmChannel page for the film

2002 films
2000s Turkish-language films
2002 drama films
Films directed by Zeki Demirkubuz
Films set in Turkey
Turkish drama films
Films shot in Ankara